List of all the members of the Storting in the period 1954 to 1957.  The list includes all those initially elected to the Storting.

There were a total of 150 representatives, distributed among the parties: 77 to Norwegian Labour Party,
27 to Conservative Party of Norway, 15 to Venstre (Norway), 14 to Farmers’ Party, 14 to Christian Democratic Party of Norway, and 3 to Norwegian Communist Party.

Aust-Agder

Vest-Agder

Akershus

Bergen

Buskerud

Finnmark

Hedmark

Hordaland

Møre and Romsdal

Nordland

Oppland

Oslo

Rogaland

Sogn and Fjordane

Telemark

Troms

Nord-Trøndelag

Sør-Trøndelag

Vestfold

Østfold

 
Parliament of Norway, 1954–57